The Activist is a 1969 American drama film directed by Art Napoleon and written by Art Napoleon and Jo Napoleon. It depicts the conflicts of a college student who, after appearing on television news decrying the Vietnam War, is torn between engaging in further anti-war protests and settling for conventional happiness with his new girlfriend. The film stars Michael Smith, who had been an actual member of the Oakland Seven, an anti-war group involved in the planning of the 1967 Stop the Draft Week. Co-star Lesley Taplin also alternated between community activism and acting at the time of production.

Also starring in the film are Tom Maier and Brian Murphy. Also, the parents of filmmaker Michael Ritchie, Benbow Ritchie and Patricia Ritchie, briefly appear as a suburban couple upset by the lead character when he appears in their neighborhood. 

The film received an X rating due to a graphic (for the time) love scene between Smith and Taplin. It was released on December 10, 1969, by Universal Pictures' shadow company Regional Film Distributors, a division created to handle films either receiving an X rating or deemed to esoteric for the studio to be associated with.

Cast   
Michael Smith as Mike Corbett
Lesley Taplin (billed as Lesley Gilbrun) as Lee James 
Tom Maier as Prof. Peter Williams
Brian Murphy as Member of Steering Committee

References

External links
 

1969 films
1960s English-language films
American drama films
1969 drama films
Films directed by Art Napoleon
1960s American films